The 2002–03 New Zealand Figure Skating Championships was held at the Ice Sports Club Rink in Gore from 30 September through 3 October 2002. Skaters competed in the disciplines of men's singles and ladies' singles across many levels, including senior, junior, novice, adult, and the pre-novice disciplines of juvenile, pre-primary, primary, and intermediate.

Senior results

Men

Ladies

External links
 2002–03 New Zealand Figure Skating Championships results

2002 in figure skating
New Zealand Figure Skating Championships
Figure Skating
September 2002 sports events in New Zealand
October 2002 sports events in New Zealand